The Nemaloni were a Gallic tribe dwelling in the middle valley of Durance river during the Iron Age.

Name 
They are mentioned as Nemaloni by Pliny (1st c. AD) and on an inscription.

Geography 
The Nemaloni lived in the middle valley of Durance river, in the southern part of the French Alps.

History 
They are mentioned by Pliny the Elder as one of the Alpine tribes conquered by Rome in 16–15 BC, and whose name was engraved on the Tropaeum Alpium.

References

Primary sources

Bibliography 

Historical Celtic peoples
Gauls
Tribes of pre-Roman Gaul